Barnhill is an unincorporated community in Wayne County, Illinois, United States. Barnhill is west of U.S. Route 45 and north of Mill Shoals. Barnhill had a post office, which closed on March 5, 2005.

References

Unincorporated communities in Wayne County, Illinois
Unincorporated communities in Illinois